Sweden Finnish is the variety of Finnish spoken in Sweden by around 250.000 active speakers. The grammar of Sweden Finnish doesn't significantly differ from Standard Finnish, but it does however contain some Swedish terminology. Sweden Finnish is the result  of Finnish immigrants arriving in Sweden, mainly between 1954-1970. Possessive suffixes are rarely used in Sweden Finnish, but some words are used as articles. 

The number of Finnish-speakers in Sweden has decreased significantly during the last decades, mainly due to lack of interest among younger generations to learn the language.

Vocabulary

References 

Finnish dialects
Languages of Sweden